
Year 864 (DCCCLXIV) was a leap year starting on Saturday (link will display the full calendar) of the Julian calendar.

Events 
 By place 

 Europe 
 Spring – Emperor Louis II (the Younger) marches with a Frankish army against Rome. While en route to the papal city, he becomes ill, and decides to make peace with Pope Nicholas I.
 July 25 – Edict of Pistres: King Charles the Bald orders defensive measures against the Vikings. He creates a large force of cavalry, which inspires the beginning of French chivalry.
 Viking raiders, led by Olaf the White, arrive in Scotland from the Viking settlement of Dublin (Ireland). He rampages the country, until his defeat in battle by King Constantine I.
 Robert the Strong, margrave of Neustria, attacks the Loire Vikings in a successful campaign. Other Viking raiders plunder the cities of Limoges and Clermont, in Aquitaine.
 King Louis the German invades Moravia, crossing the Danube River to besiege the civitas Dowina (identified, although not unanimously, with Devín Castle in Slovakia).
 Pepin II joins the Vikings in an attack on Toulouse. He is captured while besieging the Frankish city. Pepin is deposed as king of Aquitaine, and imprisoned in Senlis.
 September 13 – Pietro Tradonico dies after a 28-year reign. He is succeeded by Orso I Participazio, who becomes doge of Venice.
 King Alfonso III conquers Porto from the Emirate of Cordoba. This is the end of the direct Muslim domination of the Douro region.

 Asia 
 Mount Fuji, located on Honshu Island, erupts for 10 days, in an event known as the Jōgan eruption (Japan).
 Hasan ibn Zayd establishes the Zaydid Dynasty, and is recognized as ruler of Tabaristan (Northern Iran).

 By topic 
 Religion 
 The Christianization of Bulgaria begins: Boris I, ruler (khan) of the Bulgarian Empire, is converted to Orthodox Christianity. His family and high-ranking dignitaries accept the Orthodox faith at the capital, Pliska - from this point onwards the rulers of the Bulgarian Empire are known as ‘Tsars’ rather than ‘Khans’.

Births 
 Gu Quanwu, general of the Tang Dynasty (d. 931)
 Khumarawayh ibn Ahmad ibn Tulun, ruler of the Tulunid Dynasty (d. 896)
 Louis III, king of the West Frankish Kingdom (or 863)
 Muhammad ibn Ya'qub al-Kulayni, Muslim scholar (d. 941)
 Simeon I, ruler (khan) of the Bulgarian Empire (or 865)
 Yúnmén Wényǎn, Chinese Zen master (or 862)

Deaths 
 September 13 – Pietro Tradonico, doge of Venice
 Al-Fadl ibn Marwan, Muslim vizier 
 Al-Fadl ibn Qarin al-Tabari, Muslim governor
 Arnold of Gascony, Frankish nobleman
 Bi Xian, chancellor of the Tang Dynasty (b. 802)
 Ennin, Japanese priest and traveler
 Hucbert, Frankish nobleman (b. 820)
 Laura, Spanish abbess
 Lorcán mac Cathail, king of Uisneach (Ireland)
 Muhammad ibn al-Fadl al-Jarjara'i, Muslim vizier (or 865)
 Pei Xiu, chancellor of the Tang Dynasty (b. 791)
 Sancho II, count of Gascony (approximate date)
 Sergius I, duke of Naples
 Trpimir I, duke (knez) of Croatia
 Yahya ibn Umar, Muslim imam (or 865)

References